Regular Production Option ZR2 is a special off-road/suspension package offered by General Motors on their mid-size pickup trucks and SUVs. 
It debuted in 1994 on the Chevrolet S-10 and the GMC Sonoma pickup trucks. In 1996 it was expanded to the two-door Chevrolet S-10 Blazer and later offered on the Chevrolet Tracker.  The ZR2 package was gradually phased out with the S-Series pickup and SUV lines. However, it has made a comeback as an option on the 2017 Chevrolet Colorado.


Colorado

Features

Standard 3.6L DI DOHC V6 with 308 horsepower and 275 lb-ft of torque
Optional 2.8L Duramax Turbo-Diesel engine with 186 horsepower and 369 lb-ft of torque
Front and rear wheel flares
2" front and rear lift
3.5" wider stance
31" Goodyear Wrangler Duratrac off-road tires
Exclusive ZR2 17 x 8-inch aluminum alloy wheels
Modified rear axle with a 3.42 ratio
Front and rear electronic locking differentials
Multimatic™ shocks (DSSV)
Tubular rocker protection
Modified front and rear bumpers for better off-road obstacle clearance
Skid plates
Aggressive grille and hood combo unique to ZR2
Off-Road Mode Technology - Seamlessly pick between Desert, Mud or Mountains
Optional full-size bed-mounted spare tire carrier

S-Series

Features

 Ladder-type Frame with modified mounting points
 100mm wider track (3.9 inches wider than regular S-10)
 Increased ground clearance (Approx 3" over Regular S-Series 4x4)
 Enhanced front (7.25" ring gear) and rear (8.5" ring gear) axles w/ 3.73:1 rear-axle ratio
 Larger wheel and axle bearings
 31 x 10.50" BFG A/T Tires (Pickup), 31 x 10.50" BFG Longtrails (Blazer)
 46mm gas pressurized Bilstein Monotube shocks
 Rear track bar (Pickup), front anti-sway bar (Blazer)
 Skid plates
 Fender flares

Tracker

Features

Front and rear wheel flares
P215/75R-15 all-season tires
Exclusive ZR2 alloy wheels
Standard power windows and mirrors
Front skid plate

History
 1994 - ZR2 package is introduced with the Regular Cab second-generation S-Series Pickups
 1995 - ZR2 package expanded to Extended Cab S-Series Pickups
 1996 - ZR2 package extended to two-door Blazer models.  Third door was offered on extended cab models.
 1998 - Disc brakes are now standard on the front and rear wheels. Interior updated along with front grille and headlights.
 1999 - GM replaces the aluminum skid plates with composite skid plates. Side mirrors are updated. (much stronger)
Last model year the ZR2 option was offered on a regular-cab pickup.
 2001 - ZR2 package extended to Chevrolet Tracker
 2002 - ZR2 Trackers were upgraded to the LT trim level, offering optional leather upholstery
 2003 - During the production year, ZR2s begin shipping with General Ameritrac tires instead of BF Goodrich tires.
 GM discontinues S-Series Pickups. This is the last year that the ZR2 is available on a pickup.
 A GMC Jimmy ZR2 surfaces in Canada. The   Jimmy ZR2 was unavailable in the USA.
 2004 -  ZR2 available on Blazer and Tracker models. For the first time, the ZR2 is offered in 2WD.
 2005 -  This is the last year for the ZR2 Blazer (USA) and Jimmy (Canada)
 GM discontinues all remaining S-Series models. RPO ZR2 is phased out.
 2017 - GM reintroduces the ZR2 option on the Chevrolet Colorado.
 2022 - GM introduces the ZR2 option on the Chevrolet Silverado.

References

External links
 ZR2USA.com: Enthusiast Forum
 Chevrolet Colorado ZR2: Official Site

Chevrolet
GMC (automobile)
Automotive suspension technologies
Regular Production Option